Llangynin is a community located in Carmarthenshire, Wales. The Welsh language name of the village means "the church of St. Cynin" The population of the community taken at the 2011 census was 284.

St Cynin's church is a grade II* listed building which stands some 2 km south of the centre of the village.

The community is bordered by the communities of: Llanwinio; Meidrim; St Clears; and Llanboidy, all being in Carmarthenshire.

References

Communities in Carmarthenshire
Villages in Carmarthenshire